is a train station in Umi, Fukuoka Prefecture, Japan. It is operated by Kyushu Railway Company (JR Kyushu).

It is the southern terminus of the Kashii Line.

Lines
JR Kyushu
Kashii Line

Layout
It is a ground level station with single side platform.

Adjacent stations 

|-
|colspan=5 style="text-align:center;" |JR Kyūshū

History
The track was further extended and  opened as the new southern terminus on 29 December 1905. On 19 September 1942, the company, now renamed the Hakata Bay Railway and Steamship Company, with a few other companies, merged into the Kyushu Electric Tramway. Three days later, the new conglomerate, which had assumed control of the station, became the Nishi-Nippon Railroad (Nishitetsu). On 1 May 1944, Nishitetsu's track from Saitozaki to Umi were nationalized. Japanese Government Railways (JGR) took over control of the station and the track which served it was designated the Kashii Line. With the privatization of Japanese National Railways (JNR), the successor of JGR, on 1 April 1987, JR Kyushu took over control of the station.

Passenger statistics
In fiscal 2016, the station was used by an average of 1,884 passengers daily (boarding passengers only), and it ranked 96th among the busiest stations of JR Kyushu.

References

External links

 Umi Station (JR Kyushu) 

Railway stations in Fukuoka Prefecture
Railway stations in Japan opened in 1905
Stations of Kyushu Railway Company